2nd Rossoshinskiy is a rural locality (a khutor) in Rossoshinskoye Rural Settlement of Zernogradsky District, Russia. The  population was 203 as of 2010.

Streets 
 Mira

Geography 
2nd Rossoshinskiy is located 42 km southwest of Zernograd (the district's administrative centre) by road. 1st Rossoshinskiy is the nearest rural locality.

References

External links 
 2nd Rossoshinskiy on komandirovka.ru

Rural localities in Rostov Oblast